Step Up Revolution: Music from the Motion Picture is the soundtrack to the 2012 film, Step Up Revolution. The album was released on July 17, 2012. The album features a collection of tracks by various artists, and spawned exclusive singles from Jennifer Lopez, Fergie, and Timbaland, as well as featuring remixes of some of the year's hottest tracks. The album was released in the United Kingdom under the title Step Up 4: Miami Heat – Music from the Motion Picture. The album peaked at number #15 on the Canadian Albums Chart.

Track listing

Charts

References

Step Up (film series) albums
2012 soundtrack albums
Dance music soundtracks
2010s film soundtrack albums
Interscope Records soundtracks